In Praise of More is the third full-length studio album by British shoegazing band Engineers, released on 27 September 2010 through the Kscope label. It is the first to feature Daniel Land, Matthew Linley and Ulrich Schnauss as full-time members of the band.

Track listing
All songs written and composed by Engineers.

Singles
 "Subtober" (6 December 2010)
 "Subtober" (Single Edit)
 "Subtober" (North Atlantic Oscillation Remix)
 "To An Evergreen EP" (13 June 2011)
 "To An Evergreen" (Edit)
 "What It's Worth" (Helios Remix)
 "Twenty Paces" (Beroshima Remix)
 "In Praise of More" (Elika Remix)
 "Subtober" (North Atlantic Oscillation Remix)
 "Twenty Paces" (A Shoreline Dream Remix)
 "Hey You" (Pink Floyd cover)

Personnel

Engineers
Simon Phipps: Lead vocals on 1, 2, 3, 5, 7 and 8.
Mark Peters: Lead vocals on 4 and 6, guitars, bass and backing vocals on 7 and 8. All instruments, programming and backing vocals on 1-6 and 9 except/in addition to:
Daniel Land: Backing vocals on 1, 2, 3, 4 and 5.
Ulrich Schnauss: Synthesizers, cp 80 and backing vocals on 7 and 8.
Matthew Linley: Drums and percussion on 7 and 8.

Additional musicians
Jayn Hanna: Backing vocals on 1, 3 and 4.
Ant Read: Drums on 3.
Craig Sergeant: Percussion on 3.
Judith Beck: Backing vocals on 7 and 8.

Producers
Tracks 1-6 and 9 produced and mixed by Mark Peters.
Additional production by Dave Potter on 1, 3, 4, 5 and 6.
Additional mixing on 1-6 by Ulrich Schnauss.
Additional engineering on 1, 3 and 5 by Craig Sergeant.
Tracks 7 and 8 produced and mixed by Ulrich Schnauss and Mark Peters.
Additional engineering on 7 and 8 by Adrian Hall.
Mastered by Tom Durack.

Graphic artists
Mark Peters – cover photography.
Iain Fuller and Mark Peters – other photography.
Iain Fuller and Scott Robinson – CD package design.

References

External links
In Praise of More minisite

2010 albums
Engineers (band) albums
Kscope albums